The 1944–45 Oklahoma A&M Aggies men's basketball team represented Oklahoma A&M College, now known as Oklahoma State University, in NCAA competition in the 1944–45 season.

NCAA tournament

West Region
 Oklahoma A&M 62, Utah 37
Final Four
 Oklahoma A&M 68, Arkansas 41
Finals
 Oklahoma A&M 49, NYU 45

Notes and references

Oklahoma AandM
Oklahoma State Cowboys basketball seasons
NCAA Division I men's basketball tournament Final Four seasons
NCAA Division I men's basketball tournament championship seasons
Oklahoma AandM
Oklahoma AandM Aggies men's b
Oklahoma AandM Aggies men's b